Conveyance may refer to:
 Conveyance, the documentation of the transfer of ownership of land from one party to another—see conveyancing
 Public conveyance, a shared passenger transportation service
 A means of transport
 Water conveyance, a commuter passenger boat used to provide public transport
 Conveyance (horse), an American Thoroughbred racehorse

See also
 Conveyancer
 Conveyor (disambiguation)
 Vehicle